John Gage Lecky (4 November 1863 – 6 April 1917) was a New Zealand rugby union player who played for the All Blacks in 1884. His position of choice was forward.

Career
Out of the Grafton club, Lecky was called into the New Zealand national side to tour New South Wales in 1884 after J. Coombe Webster withdrew for business reasons.
 
Described by team manager, S.E Sleigh as "a plucky player", Gage played in seven matches on the tour (including a match against Wellington before they left) and scored four tries in the process.

He played 18 games for the Auckland province between 1883 and 1889.

Personal 
Lecky married Charlotte Wilkinson in 1887.

References

1863 births
1917 deaths
New Zealand rugby union players
New Zealand international rugby union players
Rugby union forwards
Rugby union players from Auckland